William James Baron (born December 11, 1990) is an American professional basketball player for Olimpia Milano of the Italian Lega Basket Serie A (LBA) and the EuroLeague. He is a 1.88 m (6'2") tall shooting guard.

High school
Baron attended and played high school basketball at Bishop Hendricken High School, in Warwick, Rhode Island, and at Worcester Academy, in Worcester, Massachusetts.

College career
Baron began his college basketball career with Virginia (2010–2011). He then played college basketball with Rhode Island (2011–2012). He finished his college basketball career with the Canisius Golden Griffins, in 2014. He was named the Metro Atlantic Athletic Conference Player of the Year, of the 2013–14 season and he was also named to the All-MAAC First Team in 2013 and 2014.

Professional career
Baron played with the Chicago Bulls' summer league squad, in the 2014 NBA Summer League. He then began his pro career in 2014, with the Lithuanian club Lietuvos rytas Vilnius, playing in the Lithuanian League and the European-wide 2nd-tier level EuroCup. He then played with the Detroit Pistons' summer league squad, in the 2015 NBA Summer League.

He joined the Belgian club Spirou Charleroi in 2015, playing in the Belgian League and the EuroCup. He then moved to the Spanish club UCAM Murcia, in 2016, where he played in the Spanish League and the EuroCup. He moved to Turkey in 2017, signing with the Turkish Super League club Eskişehir Basket.

In July 2018, he moved to Serbia and signed with Crvena zvezda for the 2018–19 season. With the Zvezda, he won the Adriatic SuperCup and the Adriatic League in 2019, becoming the ABA League Finals MVP. In June 2019, he extended the contract with the Zvezda for one more year.

On July 15, 2020, Baron signed a two-year deal with Russian club Zenit Saint Petersburg. He averaged 9.9 points per game. On July 2, 2021, Baron agreed to an additional one-year extension of his contract.

On June 28, 2022, Baron signed a two-year contract with Olimpia Milano of the Italian Lega Basket Serie A and Euroleague.

National team career
Baron has been a member of the senior United States national team. He was a member of Team USA at the 2017 FIBA AmeriCup, where he won a gold medal.

Personal
Baron is the son of former Canisius basketball head coach, Jim Baron, and the younger brother of the professional basketball player, Jimmy Baron.

See also
 List of KK Crvena zvezda players with 100 games played

References

External links

 Canisius Golden Griffins bio
  
 eurobasket.com profile
 EuroLeague profile
 

1990 births
Living people
ABA League players
American expatriate basketball people in Belgium
American expatriate basketball people in Lithuania
American expatriate basketball people in Russia
American expatriate basketball people in Serbia
American expatriate basketball people in Spain
American expatriate basketball people in Turkey
American men's basketball players
Basketball League of Serbia players
Basketball players from Pennsylvania
BC Rytas players
BC Zenit Saint Petersburg players
Canisius Golden Griffins men's basketball players
CB Murcia players
Eskişehir Basket players
KK Crvena zvezda players
Liga ACB players
Rhode Island Rams men's basketball players
Shooting guards
Spirou Charleroi players
Sportspeople from Altoona, Pennsylvania
United States men's national basketball team players
Virginia Cavaliers men's basketball players
Worcester Academy alumni
Bishop Hendricken High School alumni